Francis Johann Wilhelm "Franz" Duhne (2 July 1880 in Barmbek – 11 December 1945 in Milwaukee, Wisconsin) was a German track and field athlete who competed at the 1900 Summer Olympics in Paris, France. Duhne competed in the 2500 metre steeplechase. He placed last in the six-man field. In the 4000 metre steeplechase, he placed sixth of eight.

References

External links
 
 De Wael, Herman. Herman's Full Olympians: "Athletics 1900". Accessed 18 March 2006.
 

1880 births
1945 deaths
German male middle-distance runners
German male steeplechase runners
Olympic athletes of Germany
Athletes (track and field) at the 1900 Summer Olympics
Athletes from Hamburg
German emigrants to the United States
Naturalized citizens of the United States